North Carolina Highway 274 (NC 274) is a primary state highway in the U.S. state of North Carolina. It connects rural areas of Lincoln and Gaston counties to Gastonia.

Route description

History
NC 274 was established in 1930 as a new primary routing, from NC 27 to U.S. Route 74 (US 74) and NC 20 (now NC 161) in Bessemer City.  Around 1938, it was extended southeast to its current southern terminus at the South Carolina state line, where it continues as South Carolina Highway 274 (SC 274).  Between 1963 and 1968, southbound lanes along Broad Street were added on west side of tracks in downtown Gastonia.

Junction list

References

External links

 
 NCRoads.com: N.C. 274

274
Transportation in Gaston County, North Carolina
Transportation in Lincoln County, North Carolina